Uzuncaburç is an archaeological site in Mersin Province, Turkey, containing the remnants of the ancient city of Diokaisareia or Diocaesarea.

Location
The visitors from Silifke follow the  road to north and then  to east. The visitors from Mersin follow the highway  to the west up to the west of Susanoğlu where they turn north.

History
During the Hellenistic period, the area of Diokaisareia was a part of the Seleucid Empire. The region around Uzuncaburç was controlled by the local kings and queens of Olba on behalf of the Seleucid Empire. Uzuncaburç was the sacred place of the Olba people, but their main settlement was in Ura, east of the site of Diokaisareia. However, after the area was captured by the Roman Empire, Emperor Vespasian transformed the sacred place to a city, with the right to issue its coins. During the Christian age, most of the temples in Diokaisareia were converted to churches.    

During the Middle Ages the city faded away. During the Ottoman Empire, the Turkmen people established their own settlement to the east of the ancient site and named their settlement after the Hellenistic tower Uzuncaburç, which means "tall bastion" in Turkish. Now both the town and the ancient site shares the same name.

Archaeology
Main structures of interest are the following

Within the—now vanished—city walls;
Ceremonial gate:  It is at the east side of the site. Only six columns survive. There are consoles in each column which were used to erect small statues. 
Main gate: It is at the northwest of the site. There is one monumental gate and two auxiliary gates in each side.
Zeus Temple : It is in the middle of the site. It is a peripteros type temple. 36 columns survive. It was probably commissioned by Seleucus I Nicator ( BC).
Tyche Temple:It is at the west end of the site. According to an inscription it was commissioned by Oppius and Kyria.

Out of the city walls;
Theatre: It is to the east. It is a Roman structure and was built during the reign of  Marcus Aurelius (r 161–180) and Lucius Verus (r 161–169) 
Hellenistic tower: It is close to  the north east  corner of the walled site. The base area is 16*13 m2 and the height is   It was commissioned by a certain Teukros, the son of Tarkyaris. It was probably used as a hiding place of the people during the wars.
Mausoleum: It is out of the walled area and to the south east.
Necropolis: It is located in the valley to the north.

Museum status
The site is under the control of Ministry of Culture and Tourism. The site is open to visits. , admission charge was 6 Turkish lira. The visiting hours 8.00 to 18.45 (summer) and 8.00 to 16.45 (winter)

References

Gallery 

Archaeological sites in Mersin Province, Turkey
Ancient Greek archaeological sites in Turkey
History of Mersin Province
Hellenistic architecture
Silifke District
Tourist attractions in Mersin Province
Ancient Greek cities in Anatolia
Former populated places in Turkey
Roman sites in Turkey
Olba territorium